House of Hope can refer to:

House of Hope (album), by Toni Childs (1991), or its title track
House of Hope (fort)